"Ridiculous Thoughts" is a song by The Cranberries, released as the fourth single from their second studio album No Need to Argue. In North America, it was the third single of the album, as "I Can't Be with You" was released only in Fall 1995 in this territory. In 2017, the song was released as an acoustic, stripped-down version on the band's Something Else album.

Background and writing
"Ridiculous Thoughts" was recorded at The Manor Studios, Oxford and Townhouse Studios, London, during the 1994 sessions for No Need to Argue. The music for "Ridiculous Thoughts" was written by Dolores O'Riordan and Noel Hogan.

The lyrics were written by O'Riordan about her problems with British press and journalists. It was produced and engineered by Stephen Street.

Single release and chart performance
"Ridiculous Thoughts" was released as a single in July 1995. It had mild success in Ireland reaching #23 and some success in both the UK and the U.S.

As most of the Cranberries' singles in the United States, a physical CD single was not released commercially, so it did not chart on the Billboard Hot 100. It did peak at number fourteen on the US Modern Rock Tracks chart, and number twenty in the UK.

Track listing
 CD single  UK, Australia, Spain
 "Ridiculous Thoughts" (Album Version) – 4:31
 "Linger" (Album Version) – 4:34
 "Twenty One" (Live at The Point, Dublin) – 3:05
 "Ridiculous Thoughts" (Live at The Point, Dublin) – 6:08

CD single France, Japan
 "Ridiculous Thoughts" (Album Version) – 4:31
 "I Can't Be With You" (Live at The Point, Dublin) – 3:10
 "Twenty One" (Live at The Point, Dublin) – 3:05
 "Ridiculous Thoughts" (Live at The Point, Dublin) – 6:08

 7" single
 "Ridiculous Thoughts" (Album Version) – 4:31
 "Linger" (Album Version) – 4:34

Music video
The video clip for "Ridiculous Thoughts" was directed in May 1995 by Samuel Bayer and later redone by the band, using the pseudonym "Freckles Flynn".

The band was shown in front of the freaks of a circus signs (monkey rodeo, rubber skin man, etc.) on a deserted location. It features a young Elijah Wood, who tries to follow some kind of radio signal (which seems to be guided by O'Riordan's voice), all around the ruins of a building.

O'Riordan stated that the band did not understand or identify with the concept that Bayer had shown in the video, and thus, they decided to redo it, mixing the original tape with live footage from their American Tour. The original version of the video was later included on Stars: The Best of Videos 1992–2002 DVD.

Charts

References

The Cranberries songs
1995 singles
Songs written by Dolores O'Riordan
Songs written by Noel Hogan
Song recordings produced by Stephen Street